Singaperumal Koil railway station is one of the railway stations of the Chennai Beach–Chengalpattu section of the Chennai Suburban Railway Network. It serves the neighbourhood of Singaperumal Koil, a suburb of Chennai. It is situated at a distance of 51 km from Chennai Beach junction and is located on NH 45 in Singaperumal Koil, with an elevation of 45 m above sea level.

History
The lines at the station were electrified on 9 January 1965, with the electrification of the Tambaram—Chengalpattu section.

Connectivity
The level crossing no. LC47 at the station is being replaced by an overbridge with a roundabout on top at a cost of  520 million. Work commenced in 2012.

See also

 Chennai Suburban Railway

References

External links
 Singaperumal Koil railway station at IndiaRailInfo.com

 

Stations of Chennai Suburban Railway
Railway stations in Kanchipuram district